Frank S. Gaines (1890–1977) was the Mayor of Berkeley, California from 1939 to 1943.

Gaines was noted for his involvement in the Berkeley-based Pacific Coast Committee on American Principles and Fair Play, a group which addressed the plight of Japanese Americans during World War II.  The group's honorary chairman was Robert Gordon Sproul, president of the University of California.

Gaines married his wife Louise in 1923; they had three children.

Frank Gaines was born March 6, 1890, in Biggs, California, and died March 3, 1977, in Sacramento.  He was buried in Biggs.
Frank Gaines mother was Nettie Stewart Gaines who came to California in 1883.  His father was Francis Albert Gaines.  His mother wrote a book published in 1910, "The Pathway of Western Literature" which was used in many California Public Schools.  Mayor Gaines' oldest son, William Stewart Gaines, could claim to be a British subject when he reached his 18th birthday because he was born in London in 1924.  Mayor Gaines brother Clarence was connected with the Redding office of the Pacific Gas and Electric Company. His Uncle Edward C. Stewart was President of the Union Safe Deposit Bank in Stockton, Ca. (3)

References

 Berkeley Independent and Gazette, March 5, 1977
 Topaz Moon: Chiura Obata's Art of the Internment By Chiura Obata, Kimi Kodani Hill
(3) Stockton Record, March, 1941

External links
Pacific Coast Committee on American Principles and Fair Play records, The Bancroft Library

Mayors of Berkeley, California
1890 births
1977 deaths
20th-century American politicians